Fire River may refer to:

 Fire River (Ontario), Canada
 Fire River, Ontario, Canada
 Little Fire River, a river in northeastern Ontario, Canada

See also
 River fire (disambiguation)